William John Inglis (born May 11, 1943) is a Canadian former professional ice hockey centre. He played 36 games in the National Hockey League: 22 games with the Los Angeles Kings and 14 with the Buffalo Sabres between 1967 and 1970. The rest of his career, which lasted from 1963 to 1978, was spent in various minor leagues. He later coached the Sabres for part of the 1978–79 season.

Career
Inglis's professional hockey career outside the NHL was far more extensive, playing for several teams in the American Hockey League, Western Hockey League and Central Professional Hockey League over a 15-year career. He served as the head coach of the Sabres for the final 56 games of the 1978–79 season, as well for the team's first-round playoff loss that season to the Pittsburgh Penguins.

Inglis also served as head coach for the American Hockey League's Rochester Americans, the International Hockey League's Toledo Goaldiggers and Kalamazoo Wings, and the Central Hockey League's Fort Worth Brahmas until 2004.

In his NHL playing career, Inglis recorded one goal and three assists.  As the Sabres' head coach, his records were 28–18–10 (regular season) and 1–2 (playoffs).

Career statistics

Regular season and playoffs

Coaching record

References

External links
 

1943 births
Living people
Binghamton Dusters players
Buffalo Sabres coaches
Buffalo Sabres players
Canadian ice hockey coaches
Canadian ice hockey centres
Cincinnati Swords players
Hershey Bears players
Houston Apollos players
Hull-Ottawa Canadiens players
Ice hockey people from Ottawa
Los Angeles Kings players
Montreal Junior Canadiens players
New Haven Nighthawks players
Omaha Knights (CHL) players
Phoenix Roadrunners (CHL) players
Rochester Americans coaches
Springfield Indians players
Springfield Kings players